
A surfboard is an elongated platform used in the sport of surfing and windsurfing.

Surfboard may also refer to:

Music
 "Surfboard" (Antônio Carlos Jobim song) a song by Antônio Carlos Jobim and covered by many artists
 "Surfboard" (Cody Simpson song), 2014 single by Cody Simpson

Other uses
 "Surface Transportation Board, U.S. government agency, also known as Surfboard, a short name for the 
 Surfboard, a wrestling holding move, also known as a Romera Special
 SURFboard, a trademarked name of cable modem